Horse & Hound is the oldest equestrian weekly magazine of the United Kingdom. Its first edition was published in 1884. The magazine contains horse industry news, reports from equestrian events, veterinary advice about caring for horses, and horses for sale. Fox hunting has always been an important topic for the magazine, as are the sports of eventing, dressage, show jumping, horse racing, showing, carriage driving and endurance riding. The magazine includes commentaries from top riders and trainers including event rider William Fox-Pitt, top eventing trainer Captain Mark Phillips, top show jumper William Funnell and Olympic dressage rider and trainer Carl Hester, among others.

Among the major annual equestrian events reported by Horse & Hound are Badminton Horse Trials, Burghley Horse Trials, The Horse of the Year Show and the Olympia London International Horse Show.

The magazine is published by Future plc. The latest copy reaches shops every Thursday, while press day is Monday.

Sister publications 
Horse & Hound is one of a number of specialist publications produced by Future Publishing.

In the past Horse & Hound had two sister equestrian publications, Eventing magazine and HORSE magazine. Eventing was incorporated into Horse & Hound in 2015 and HORSE was sold to MyTimeMedia in spring 2013.

Horse & Hound online 
Horse & Hounds online edition is updated daily with equestrian news and reports from horse events. The site includes a forum where horse enthusiasts can share their experiences with others and ask for help with horse related problems. The website also publishes details of major horse events, biographies of riders and also has picture galleries.

In popular culture 
Horse & Hound was shown and mentioned in the 1999 film Notting Hill. Hugh Grant's character claims to be a journalist from the magazine at a press junket, and later at a news conference.

In the 1995 film Circle of Friends, Celia Westward is shown reading Horse & Hound.

2020’s “Dream Horse” has Jan Vokes played by Toni Collette look at Equestrian magazines before picking up a copy of “Horse & Hound” and browsing its contents before an advert for Directory of The Turf catches her eye with “Everything you need to know about Thoroughbred Racing & Breeding in 1 book.” She subsequently tears out the advert.

References

External links
 Horse & Hound website

Weekly magazines published in the United Kingdom
English-language magazines
Equine magazines
Magazines established in 1884
1884 establishments in the United Kingdom
Horses in the United Kingdom